Dasyscolia ciliata is a species of scoliid wasp found throughout the Mediterranean. It is the only species in the genus Dasycolia. It is the only known pollinator of the European Ophrys speculum. The male wasp is tricked into pollinating the Ophrys orchid (via pseudocopulation) by mimicking the female wasp in appearance and scent.

References

External links

 Dasyscolia ciliata – Encyclopedia of Life

Scoliidae
Orchid pollinators
Insects described in 1787
Monotypic Hymenoptera genera